Paras is a 1949 romantic drama Indian film directed by Anant Thakur and starring Madhubala, Kamini Kaushal and Rehman in lead roles.

The music of the film was composed by Ghulam Mohammad. It is counted among the biggest musical hits of Mohammad; popular songs from this album include "Is Dard Ki Maari Duniya", "Dil Ka Sahara Chhute Na" and "Dil Le Ke Chupne Wale".

Plot 
The movie starts with Paras which is house of a wealthy man (K.N.Singh). He starts playing cards with his friend (D.K.Sapru) and starts losing everything including Paras and from where story takes many twist and turns.

Cast 
Main cast of the film were the following:

 Madhubala as Priya
 Kamini Kaushal as Geeta
 Rehman as Kumar
 Sulochana Chatterjee as Champa

 K.N. Singh
 D.K. Sapru
 Gope as Bankey (Chajjoo)
 Cuckoo as the dancer

Soundtrack 
The soundtrack of Paras was composed by Ghulam Mohammed and the lyrics were penned by Shakeel Badayuni.

Reception 
Paras was a commercial success and the twentieth highest-grossing Bollywood film of 1949.

The film received positive reviews from critics. Baburao Patel of Filmindia called it "a rare mix of excellent performances and entertainment." A majority of his review focused on Madhubala's portrayal; he wrote that "[w]ith her superb versatility, Madhubala makes Kamini Kaushal look like an amateur." Author Jagdish Bhatia was also loud in his praise for Madhubala's work and favourably compared it to Jane Wyman's Academy Award-winning performance in Johnny Belinda (1948).

Sources

References

External links 

1949 romantic drama films
Indian romantic drama films